Lost Penny is an Independent Film drama by CubeCity Entertainment, in association with Curium Films. Mann Munoz directed the film and Roberto Munoz produced. The movie features Rachael McOwen, Victoria Guthrie, Andrew Roth, Christopher Elliott, Stephen Velichko, and Victoria Murdoch. It is partly inspired by Alice in Wonderland as Penny travels to a mysterious underworld club where she meets an assortment of quirky characters.

Filming took place in the Niagara Region in August 2014. The filmmakers worked with Broadway Lights Dance Studio of St. Catharines, Ontario. They reconnected with the studio after having worked with them in the musical Job and the Snake. The film was screened at the Manhattan Film Festival (as a festival award winner) and the Niagara Integrated Film Festival where it sold out its screening.

Plot
Lost Penny tells the story of a young woman's search for the father she has never met. When Penny (Rachael McOwen, of The Amazing Spider-Man 2) comes across a mysterious box that promises to grant her greatest wish, she is transported to an Underworld Club. There she meets Lucien (Christopher Elliott). He tells her that to get her wish, she must play the Game and reach “Number One”. Penny encounters a series of quirky characters before coming across a solitary Barefoot Man (Thomas Nelson). He warns her about Lucien. Penny doesn't know what to believe when Tenshi (Andrew Roth) turns up and reveals the sinister secret of the Club. Before Tenshi can help her, Lucien steps in and shows his true self.

Cast
 Rachael McOwen as Penny
 Victoria Guthrie as Penny's mother
 Andrew Roth as Tenshi
 Christopher Elliott as Lucien
 Stephen Velichko as Gadget
 Victoria Murdoch as Fudge
 Melanie Gaydos as Hostess
 William J Bruce III as Mario "Kingpin" Harris

Film Festivals
 Manhattan Film Festival (Winner) 
 Niagara Integrated Film Festival

References

External links
 Lost Penny website
 Lost Penny at the Internet Movie Database

2010s English-language films
Films directed by Mann Munoz